Vincent Ricard (born  in Nantes) is a French bobsledder.

Ricard competed at the 2014 Winter Olympics for France. He teamed with driver Thibault Godefroy, Jérémy Baillard and Jérémie Boutherin in the France-2 sled in the four-man event, finishing 23rd.

As of April 2014, his best showing at the World Championships is 27th, coming in the two-man event in 2011.

Ricard made his World Cup debut in January 2012. As of February 2015, his best finish is 14th, in a four-man event in 2014-15 at La Plagne.

References

1985 births
Living people
Olympic bobsledders of France
Sportspeople from Nantes
Bobsledders at the 2014 Winter Olympics
Bobsledders at the 2018 Winter Olympics
French male bobsledders